Joanne Marie Meehan (born 25 January 1977) is an Australian retired swimmer.

Career
Meehan represented Australia at the 1992 Barcelona Olympics in two events. She placed sixth in the final of the women's 100m backstroke, swimming a personal best time of 1min 2.07sec. In the women's 100m medley relay she swam the backstroke leg in the heat. The team qualified for the final, in which Nicole Livingstone took over the backstroke leg.

Meehan finished with third places in the 50m and 100m backstroke events at the 1993 Australian Swimming Championships.

References

1977 births
Living people
Australian female backstroke swimmers
Olympic swimmers of Australia
Swimmers at the 1992 Summer Olympics
20th-century Australian women